My First Love (French: J'ai dix-sept ans) is a 1945 French comedy drama film directed by André Berthomieu and starring Jacqueline Delubac, Aimé Clariond and Madeleine Suffel. It was based on a play of the same title by Paul Vandenberghe. The film's sets were designed by the art director Raymond Nègre.

The film had admissions in France of 2,442,552.

Synopsis
Bob, a student, is very emotionally close to his mother Suzanne. He is alarmed when she seems about to begin a relationship with a novelist, regarding it as a betrayal.

Cast
 Jacqueline Delubac as Suzanne
 Gérard Nery as Bob
 Aimé Clariond as Le romancier Maurice Fleurville
 Madeleine Suffel as Louise - la femme de chambre
 Jacques Louvigny as L'oncle Victor
 Jacques Famery as René
 Jean Diéner as Le prof de philo
 Paul Faivre as Le prof de première
 Louis Florencie as Le proviseur
 Robert Moor as Firmin, le valet de chambre
 Charles Bouillaud as Le pion
 Christiane Sertilange as Mado
 Guy Loriquet as Ménard

References

Bibliography
 Bessy, Maurice & Chirat, Raymond. ''Histoire du cinéma français: encyclopédie des films, 1940-1950. Pygmalion, 1986

External links
My First Love at IMDb

1945 films
French black-and-white films
Films directed by André Berthomieu
1940s French-language films
French drama films
Pathé films
1945 drama films
French films based on plays
1940s French films